Papyrus 14 (in the Gregory-Aland numbering), α 1036 (in the Soden's numbering), signed by 𝔓14, is an early copy of the New Testament in Greek. It is a papyrus manuscript written in form of codex. The manuscript palaeographically has been assigned to the 5th century.

Description 
The manuscript contains the text of the First Epistle to the Corinthians (1:25-27; 2:6-8; 3:8-10; 3:19-20). The manuscript is written in 1 column per page.

The Greek text of this codex is a representative of the Alexandrian text-type. Aland placed it in Category II.

It was discovered in Saint Catherine's Monastery on Mount Sinai in Egypt by J. Rendel Harris, who published its text in 1890. It was also examined by Schofield.

The manuscript currently is housed at the Saint Catherine's Monastery (Harris 14).

See also 
 List of New Testament papyri
 Papyrus 11

References

Further reading 

 James Rendel Harris, Biblical fragments from Mount Sinai I, (London 1890), pp. 54–56.
 

Papyrus 0014
Papyrus 0014
First Epistle to the Corinthians papyri